Disco Mix Club is primarily a remix label under (British Phonographic Industry) licence, which is not intended for the mass market but rather exclusively for professional DJs and enthusiasts. The Disco Mix Club sells megamixes and remixes every month produced by other disc jockeys, and publishes the weekly magazine, Update. The monthly Mixmag (the UK dance music bible for many years) was initially published by the Disco Mix Club, but it was bought in January 1997 by the British media group EMAP, and is currently owned by Wasted Talent Ltd after being published by Development Hell for a number of years in the late 2000s.

The first disc jockeys who created the remixes and megamixes are among the best known: Alan Coulthard (who is also the creator of "Megamix" 1 taken on behalf of the Disco Mix Club), Sanny Xenokottas (Sanny X), Les Adams, Chad Jackson, Dave Seaman, Steve Anderson, Peter Slaghuis, Daniel Culot (DJ Jaguar from 1986 to 1990, one of the creators/producers of the Belgian new beat movement in 1988), Paul Dakeyne and Ben Liebrand.

See also
DMC World DJ Championships, an annual turntablism competition

References

External links
Disco Mix Club
Discography at Discogs.com
Discography at RemixServices.com
Discography at g-e-m-a.eu

DJing
Music companies of the United Kingdom
Entertainment companies established in 1983
1983 establishments in the United Kingdom
1997 mergers and acquisitions
Remix services